Pradeep Kumar (born Sital Batabyal; 4 January 1925 – 3 November 2001) was an Indian actor who is recognized for his work in Hindi, Bengali and English-language films.

Career
When Kumar was 17 years old, he decided to take up acting. He started his film career in Bengali films. His notable roles in Bengali films were in Alaknanda (1947), directed by renowned filmmaker Debaki Bose, and in 42 (1951).

Pradeep Kumar Batabayal then shifted to Bombay and Filmistan studios, and had an important role in the film Anand Math (1952). He played the lead role with Bina Rai in Anarkali (1953) and with Vyjayanthimala in Nagin (1954). Both films were very popular and had songs that added to the movies' success. He worked with Madhubala in eight films, of which Raj Hath (1956), Shirin Farhad (1956), Gateway of India (1957), Yahudi Ki Ladki (1957) and Passport (1961) were massive hits. He had a spate of releases in the second half of the 1950s. He did not enjoy as much success in the 1960s, though Ghoonghat (1960), Aarti (1962) & Taj Mahal (1963) were successful. He worked with Meena Kumari in seven films; Adil-E-Jahangir, Bandhan (1956 film), Chitralekha, Bahu Begum (1967), Bheegi Raat, Aarti and Noorjehan; and with Mala Sinha in eight films; Naya Zamana, Hamlet, Baadshah, Detective (1958 movie), Fashion (1959 film), Ek Shola, Duniya Na Maane, and Mitti Mein Sona.

He also worked with the legendary Bengali actor and matinee idol Uttam Kumar in Grihadaha in 1967 which was produced by Uttam himself and then he worked in Plot No 5.

He did not get to act with the newer heroines of the 1960s such as Sadhana, Saira Banu, Babita or Sharmila Tagore, though he did work with Asha Parekh in Ghoonghat and Meri Surat Teri Aankhen and with Waheeda Rehman in Rakhi (1962). In 1969, he moved to character roles with Sambandh and Mehboob Ki Mehndi, but did not have many visible roles until Gandhi, which won several Academy Awards and was his debut Hollywood movie. Some of his later films include Jaanwar and Razia Sultan in 1983.

Awards
He won the Kalakar Award - Lifetime Achievement Award (1999).

Death
Pradeep Kumar  died in Calcutta on 3 November 2001, at the age of 76. His daughter Beena Banerjee plays character roles in movies and TV serials including Uttaran; her son Siddharth Banerjee worked as assistant director in  Sajid Khan's Housefull 2 (2012) and Himmatwala (2013).

Filmography

Bengali
Pradeep Kumar played Bandit Mohan (Dosshu Mohan in Bengali), a character based on the very popular Bengali crime thriller series "Dossu Mohan".

Hindi films

References

External links
 An article from rediff.com
 

1925 births
2001 deaths
20th-century Indian male actors
Indian male film actors
Male actors in Bengali cinema
Male actors in Hindi cinema
Male actors from Kolkata